Leptodactylus knudseni, commonly called Knudsen's frog is a species of frog in the family Leptodactylidae. Its local name is sapo-toro amazonico  ("Amazonian toad-frog").

It is found in Bolivia, Brazil, Colombia, Ecuador, French Guiana, Guyana, Peru, Suriname, Venezuela, and possibly Trinidad and Tobago. Its natural habitats are subtropical or tropical moist lowland forests, moist savanna, rivers, intermittent rivers, intermittent freshwater marshes, and rural gardens. It is not considered threatened by the IUCN.

References

knudseni
Amphibians of Bolivia
Amphibians of Brazil
Amphibians of Colombia
Amphibians of Ecuador
Amphibians of French Guiana
Amphibians of Guyana
Amphibians of Peru
Amphibians of Suriname
Amphibians of Venezuela
Amphibians described in 1972
Taxonomy articles created by Polbot